Jimmy Shirley (1913-1989) was an American jazz and R&B guitarist who recorded from the 1940s to the 1970s. He was an early exponent of the electric guitar and was one of the first to use the Vibrola vibrato arm in recordings, such as "Jimmy’s Blues" (1945).

Career
While growing up in Cleveland, he was taught guitar by his father. In 1937 he moved to New York City and spent four years with the Clarence Profit Trio. In 1940 he recorded with Wingy Carpenter. He worked with Ella Fitzgerald from 1942–1943 and with Phil Moore and Herman Chittison. During the 1940s, he recorded with Clyde Bernhardt, Sid Catlett, Sidney De Paris, Edmond Hall, John Hardee, Coleman Hawkins, Art Hodes, Billie Holiday, James P. Johnson, Pete Johnson, Billy Kyle, and Ram Ramirez.

Beginning in the 1950s, Shirley played less swing guitar, more blues, jump blues, and rock and roll. He recorded or accompanied singers Wynonie Harris, Jimmy Rushing, Screamin Jay Hawkins, Little Willie John, Rose Murphy and Barbara Lea. He performed in Europe during the 1970s, recorded the album Steff and Slam with Stéphane Grappelli and Slam Stewart, and China Boy (Black and Blue, 1975), his only album as a leader.

References

1989 deaths
American jazz guitarists
American male guitarists
1913 births
20th-century American guitarists
20th-century American male musicians
American male jazz musicians
Black & Blue Records artists
Blue Note Records artists